Majesty is a prefix for something that (notionally) belongs to the monarch, as in HM Ship or HMS (His/Her Majesty's ship), HM Government, etc.

Majesty may also refer to:

Vehicles and transportation
 Norwegian Majesty, a ship in Norwegian Cruise Lines
 Toyota Majesty, a minivan vehicle sold in Thailand

Video games
 Majesty: The Fantasy Kingdom Sim, a real-time strategy computer game developed by Cyberlore Studios in 2000 and first published by MicroProse
 Majesty: The Northern Expansion, an expansion pack for the 2000 RTS game Majesty: The Fantasy Kingdom Sim, by Cyberlore
 Majesty 2: The Fantasy Kingdom Sim, a 2009 sequel to the above produced by Paradox Interactive

Music

Albums
 Majesty (album), by Ron Kenoly
 Majesty, a live DVD from band The Black Dahlia Murder

Artists
 Majesty (band), a German heavy metal band
 Majesty, a band formed in 1985 by John Petrucci, John Myung, Mike Portnoy, Kevin Moore, and Chris Collins, which later became known as Dream Theater
 Majesty, a rapper from the Queens borough of the city of New York, and member of hip hop group Live Squad

Songs
"Majesty" (song), a 2018 song by Nicki Minaj, Labrinth and Eminem
"Majesty", a song by Blind Guardian from the album Battalions of Fear, 1988
"Majesty", a song by Madrugada from the album Grit, 2002
"Majesty", a song by Ghost from the album Meliora, 2015
"Majesty", a 1978 hymn by Dr. Jack W. Hayford
"Majesty (Here I Am)", a song by Delirious? from the album World Service, 2003
"Majesty", a 2018 song by Apashe and Wasiu

Other uses
 Christ in Majesty

See also

 Imperial and Royal Majesty (style) HI&RM

 Majestic (disambiguation)
 Her Majesty (disambiguation)
 His Majesty (disambiguation)
 Imperial Majesty (disambiguation)